General Staff Academy may refer to:

General Staff Academy (Russia) (formerly the Soviet General Staff Academy}
General Staff Academy (Imperial Russia), or Nicholas General Staff Academy